William Marwick (1833-1925) was a settler who came from England in 1852 as an 18-year-old boy, to York, Western Australia, and "by sheer industry, perseverance and enterprise" built up a large carting and fodder business, and amassed large land holdings.  He was closely involved in the opening up of the goldfields in the 1880s and 1890s.

Early years 
Marwick was born in Emneth near Ely, England on 2 May 1833.  At the age of 17, he left for Australia on the Sir Walter Raleigh along with a number of others from his district. On board the ship, he was chosen as constable to supervise 26 other young men during the voyage. "It was my job to see they kept the place clean and tidy".  Marwick turned 18 during the voyage.  The ship arrived in Fremantle on 31 May 1852. On 14 July 1852, Marwick left Perth to travel 100 kilometres on foot to Tipperary, near York, to work for Samuel Evans Burges.  According to family stories, he walked the distance in one day.

At this time, because of the arrival of convicts in Western Australia, there was plenty of work available, "wages were low and men were plentiful". "There were hundreds of friendly natives in the locality, but for four months at a time I never saw a white man."  

Marwick wrote further about his first year in York in letters to the Eastern Districts Chronicle in 1917:

Sandalwood trade
After a period when he was leasing land from Samuel Evans Burges, which he cleared and farmed, in about 1858, Marwick became a sandalwood cutter and sub-let his farm.  He arranged a deal with Burges to cut and deliver three tons of sandalwood each week, provided he had the exclusive right to cut sandalwood for himself on Burges's government leases.

Marwick and the Mongers
In about 1861, there was a crash in the price of sandalwood.  Marwick was rescued from financial difficulties by John Henry Monger Snr. who still had confidence in the sandalwood trade.:

As a result, Marwick was able to continue to work throughout the slump and keep his teams of cutters.

In 1864, he was the first to cart from York all the way to Fremantle and back.  Marwick's teams were the first to use the Fremantle Bridge after it was completed in 1866. He was also the first to cart from York to Albany and back.

Marwick was mainly carting sandalwood for the Mongers and worked so much in association with John Henry Monger Jnr that he even appeared to be in partnership as he spoke of "Mr Monger and I [having] men here, there and everywhere, from Albany Old Road to Kalgoorlie...".

Henry Beard and Mary Ann Batty
Marwick was friends with former convict and baker Henry Beard and his de facto wife Mary Ann Batty. On 7 April 1864, Henry Beard was tried and convicted of sheep stealing. He was sentenced to seven years gaol.  Marwick petitioned for his release a number of times but these petitions were unsuccessful.  William settled in with Mary Ann Batty in York and they had six children together, including future politician Warren Marwick. They lived a few doors away from Janet Millett.

Dispute with Walkinshaw Cowan
Resident Magistrate Walkinshaw Cowan kept pigs at his home which frequently wandered to Marwick's wheat stack.  Marwick could not seek the assistance of the pound-keeper because he was James Cowan, Walkinshaw's son (born 1848), who Cowan had appointed pound-keeper, as well as Postmaster and Magistrate's clerk in 1864, when he was 16.  In March 1866, Marwick impounded 8 pigs, but released them on Cowan saying that if he claimed damages from the pound-keeper, Cowan would pay.  Marwick claimed damages but James Cowan, the pound-keeper did not recognise any damages and said Marwick should take the matter to the magistrate, who was of course Walkinshaw Cowan.  Marwick resorted to writing to the paper, complaining about the situation and Cowan's 16-year-old boy being appointed pound-keeper.

Several letters were written complaining about Marwick, one claiming he was semi-literate and under the influence of a former convict.

1870s and 1880s
By the mid 1870s, Marwick's business had grown to considerable size.  An advertisement on 24 November 1877 offered timber and other building materials for sale, and horses and drays for hire, as well as carting "to any part of the Colony".

Marwick's Shed was built in about 1876.

On behalf of Monger, Marwick bought new breeds of pig and cattle to improve breeding in the York district.

In 1884, he went to Albany with Edward Keane, railway contractor, to meet Anthony Hordern III and convey him to York over the prospective route of the Great Southern Railway, which Hordern was promoting to investors in England.  Marwick continued to run teams to Fremantle and back until the York railway line was completed in 1885.  He was then principally engaged in farming pursuits.

Opening up the goldfields
Following the discovery of gold in the Yilgarn in 1887, in Marwick's words:
 
 

Marwick disposed of his interest in Cobb & Co in January 1896.

Retirement and death
Marwick retired in 1897.  By that time he had built up large farming and pastoral interests in the York district.  He travelled to England and America. He returned to Australia and toured the Eastern States, and in 1905 married Mary Ann in York. He returned to England to live in Wisbech, not far from his birthplace. He returned to Western Australia again in 1914, visiting his old friend Frank Craig in Balingup and touriing the South-West. He died in 1925 aged 91, and Mary Ann died the following year in York.  By the time of his death he had amassed considerable wealth.

Notes

References

1833 births
1925 deaths
Settlers of Western Australia